Feliz Navidad (1982) is Menudo's 12th album, and third Christmas album. The album was originally released in late 1982 with ten tracks and reissued in late 1983 with fourteen tracks. Both versions of this album have two different covers, with the second cover featuring Ricky Meléndez, Johnny Lozada, Xavier Serbiá, Miguel Cancel, and Charlie Massó. Both are compilations containing songs from their past Christmas albums Felicidades and Es Navidad.

Track listings

1982 release
 La Gallina - Singer: René Farrait
 Traigo Una Parranda - Singer: Xavier Serbiá
 Las Nubes - Singer : Johnny Lozada
 Voy También - Singer: Johnny Lozada
 Chiji Navideño - Singer: All the group
 Mi Parranda - Singer: Óscar Meléndez
 El Tamborilero - Singer: Johnny Lozada
 Eso Es Lo Mío - Singer: Óscar Meléndez and René Farrait
 Las Navidades - Singer: Ricky Meléndez
 Año Nuevo Y Reyes - Singer: Johnny Lozada

1983 release 
 La Gallina - Singer: René Farrait
 Traigo Una Parranda - Singer: Xavier Serbiá
 Noche De Paz - Singer: René Farrait
 Las Nubes - Singer : Johnny Lozada
 Las Navidades - Singer: Ricky Melendez
 Ensillando Mi Caballo - Singer: Carlos Meléndez and Fernando Sallaberry
 Chiji Navideño - Singer: All the group
 Mi Parranda - Singer: Óscar Meléndez
 El Tamborilero - Singer: Johnny Lozada
 Eso Es Lo Mío - Singer: Óscar Meléndez and René Farrait
 Ñaqui Quiñaqui - Singer: All the group
 Voy También - Singer: Johnny Lozada
 Año Nuevo Y Reyes - Singer: Johnny Lozada
 Plena Borinqueña - Singer: Fernando Sallaberry

Menudo (band) albums
1982 Christmas albums
Pop Christmas albums
Christmas albums by Puerto Rican artists